Nicklin Way (SR6) is a major road in Sunshine Coast, Queensland, Australia. It is named after former Queensland Premier Frank Nicklin, who opened the road on 5 June 1965. It runs from the southern end of the Sunshine Motorway at Mooloolaba in the north to Caloundra in the south, with the route signed as State Route 6. With the population of Sunshine Coast growing quickly, the road is often prone to congestion.

The construction of the road included the construction of concrete bridges spanning the Mooloolah River, Currimundi Lake and Tucker's Creek at Mooloolaba. The bridges spanning Mooloolah River and Currimundi Lake are named McKenzies Bridge and Ahern Bridge respectively.

Upgrades

Safety improvements
A project to improve safety and capacity on a section of the road, at a cost of $7 million, was completed in November 2020.

New intersection
A project to provide a new intersection with the road, at a cost of $18.2 million, was in the detailed design stage in August 2022.

Major intersections
The entire road is in the Sunshine Coast local government area.

References

External links
Fixed speed and red light cameras on Nicklin Way and surrounds, (Locations of speed and red light cameras, Queensland Government)

Sunshine Coast, Queensland
Roads in Queensland